Madson is both a surname and a given name. Notable people with the name include:

John Madson (1923–1995), American journalist
David Madson (born 1976), better known as Odd Nosdam, American underground hip hop producer and DJ
David Madson (murder victim), American murdered by his boyfriend, the serial killer Andrew Cunanan
Ryan Madson (born 1980), American professional baseball player
Madson (footballer, born 1986), Brazilian football attacking midfielder
Madson (footballer, born 1991), Brazilian football midfielder
Madson (footballer, born 1992), Brazilian football right-back
Madson (footballer, born 1999), Brazilian football forward

See also
 Madson (TV series)
 Madison (name)

Surnames of Scandinavian origin